This is a list of Carnatic instrumentalists: musicians famous for playing the carnatic music of South India. Musicians are listed by the instrument they have played.

Bowed strings

Violin

 Lalgudi Jayaraman
 Kunnakudi Vaidyanathan
 Tirumakudalu Chowdiah
 Dwaram Venkataswamy Naidu
 M. S. Gopalakrishnan
 T. N. Krishnan
 H.K. Venkatram
 L. Vaidyanathan
 L. Subramaniam
 L. Shankar
 Mysore brothers - Mysore Nagaraj & Dr. Mysore Manjunath
 Embar Kannan
 G. J. R. Krishnan and Lalgudi Vijayalakshmi
 Ragini Shankar
 A. Kanyakumari
 Ganesh and Kumaresh
 M. Narmadha
 Vittal Ramamurthy
 V. V. Ravi
 Nedumangad Sivanandan
 Avaneeswaram S R Vinu
 Delhi P. Sunder Rajan
 B. Sasikumar
 Gingger Shankar
 Jyotsna Srikanth
 Balabhaskar
 Abhijith P. S. Nair
 Ambi Subramaniam

Plucked strings

Veena

 Karaikudi Sambasiva Iyer
 Challapally Chitti Babu
 Emani Sankara Sastry
 S. Balachander
 Doraiswamy Iyengar
 E. Gayathri
 Jayanthi Kumaresh
 Kalpakam Swaminathan
 Ranganayaki Rajagopalan
 Rajhesh Vaidhya
 Revathy Krishna

Mandolin

 U. Srinivas

Chitra veena
 N. Ravikiran

Guitar
 R. Prasanna
 Sukumar Prasad

Winds

Venu

 T. R. Mahalingam
 N. Ramani
 Prapancham Sitaram
 Shashank
 K. Bhaskaran
 T. Viswanathan
 B. Shankar Rao
 Tiruchy L. Saravanan

Nadaswaram

 T.N. Rajarathnam Pillai
 Namagiripettai Krishnan
 Sheik Chinna Moulana
 Sheik Mahaboob Subhani

Saxophone

 Kadri Gopalnath

Percussions

Piano 
 Anil Srinivasan

Mridangam

 Palghat Mani Iyer
 Palghat R. Raghu
 Vellore G. Ramabhadran
 Mavelikkara Velukkutty Nair
 Umayalpuram K. Sivaraman
 Trichy Sankaran
 Karaikudi Mani
 Ramnad V. Raghavan
 T. Ranganathan
 Palani Subramaniam Pillai
 Mannargudi Easwaran
 Guruvayur Dorai
 T. V. Gopalakrishnan
 Ramesh Srinivasan
 Patri Satish Kumar
 Erickavu N. Sunil
 Thiruvarur Bakthavathsalam

Ghatam
 T. H. "Vikku" Vinayakram
 Ghatam Udupa

Kanjira
 G. Harishankar
 V. Selvaganesh

Thavil
 Haridwaramangalam A. K. Palanivel

Morsing (jaw harp)

 Srirangam Kannan

Other

Idakka
 Tripunithura Krishnadas

Jaltarang
 Anayampatti S. Ganesan
 Seethalakshmi Doraiswamy

Santoor
 R. Visweswaran

See also

 Carnatic music
 South India

References

External links
Information on Carnatic music
 (resource for lyrics of a number of Carnatic kritis)
Indian classical Instrumentalists 

Lists of musicians by genre
India music-related lists